The 8th Annual Indonesian Movie Awards was held on May 14, 2014, at the Studio 8 RCTI, West Jakarta. The award show was hosted by Lukman Sardi and Prisia Nasution. And the nominations have been announced for the category of Favorite, which will be chosen by the public via SMS. As for the category of Best, will be selected by a jury that has been appointed. As a guest star who will fill the event, among them Afgan, Titi DJ, Indro Kusumonegoro, Elvy Sukaesih, Ira Swara, and Siti Badriah.

Soekarno and What They Don't Talk About When They Talk About Love leads the nominations with eight nominations each, with Cinta/Mati and Sokola Rimba followed behind with six nominations and La Tahzan with five nominations. In the night ceremonies, What They Don't Talk About When They Talk About Love were biggest winner with receiving three awards trophies each. Followed behind by film Cinta/Mati, Hari Ini Pasti Menang, Soekarno, and Sokola Rimba success taking home two awards.

For the second time, Indonesian Movie Awards honor Lifetime Achievement Award to a figure that is considered to be dedicated to the world of Indonesian film. This award is given to Rachmat Hidayat because of his dedication and totality in Indonesian film.

Winners and nominees

Best
Winners are listed first and highlighted in boldface.

Favorite
Winners are listed first and highlighted in boldface.

Film with most nominations and awards

Most nominations

The following film received most nominations:

Most wins
The following film received most nominations:

References

External links
 Situs web resmi IMA 2014 

Indonesian
2014 in Indonesia
Indonesian Movie Actor Awards